Jangamgudem is a village in Nuzvid mandal in Krishna District in the IndianIndian state of Andhra Pradesh.  it had a population of 2,164 in 563 householdsdivision]].

Geography

The village mostly consists of dry lands. Irrigation is based on canals and ponds. Bore wells are also extensively used for agricultural purposes. Around the village fresh ground water can be found near a depth of around 600 feet. The soil is red soil.

References 

Villages in Krishna district